Botswana was scheduled to compete at the 2012 Summer Paralympics in London, United Kingdom from August 29 to September 9, 2012.

The country had selected a single athlete, visually impaired runner Tshotlego Golden, who would take part in the men's 200m sprint (T13). However, Botswana was forced to withdraw at the last moment, mere hours before the opening ceremony, when the Botswana National Olympic Committee cancelled its financial support, citing "financial irregularities" in the national Paralympics body. 

These were the second consecutive Games in which Botswana had withdrawn at the last moment; in 2008, the country's sole athlete, defending champion sprinter Tshotlego Morama, was injured shortly before the Games began, and had to withdraw.

Athletics 

Men’s Track and Road Events

See also

 Botswana at the 2012 Summer Olympics

References

Nations at the 2012 Summer Paralympics
2012
2012 in Botswana sport